The Shikshapatri (Devanagari: शिक्षापत्री) is a religious text consisting of two hundred and twelve verses, written in Sanskrit by Swaminarayan. The Shikhapatri is believed to have been written in the current form in Sanskrit by Sahajanand Swami, who incorporated into and compiled the scripture known as Satsangi Jivan. The Shikshapatri is a key scripture to all followers of the Swaminarayan Sampradaya and is considered the basis of the sect.

The Shikshapatri was written in Vadtal on (Maha Sud 5, 1882 VS) 11 February 1826. It is a dharma text, providing detailed instructions on how to live a spiritually uplifting life.

Summary of teaching

The Gazetteer of the Bombay Presidency summarised the teachings of the Shiskshapatri as:

The book of precepts strictly prohibits the destruction of animal life; promiscuous intercourse with the other sex; use of animal food and intoxicant liquors and drugs on any occasion, suicide, theft and robbery; false accusation against a fellow man; blasphemy; company of atheists and heretics, and other practices which might counteract the effect of the founder's teaching.

Governor Sir John Malcolm
On 26 February 1830,At Rajkot a historic meeting took place between Swaminarayan and Sir John Malcolm, the then Governor of Bombay. At this meeting, Lord Swaminarayan presented a copy of the Shikshapatri to Sir John Malcolm. This copy is now housed at the Bodleian Library of the University of Oxford.

Languages

Swaminarayan instructed Nityanand Swami to translate Shikshapatri from Sanskrit into Gujarati. It has since been translated numerous times into other languages. It has been translated to Bengali, Gujarati, Hindi, Marathi, Tamil, Telugu, Udiya, Urdu, Vraj, Afrikaans, Arabic, Chinese, Dutch, English, Finnish, French, German, Greek, Italian, Modern Hebrew, North Sotho, Portuguese, Russian, South Sotho, Spanish, Swahili, Xhosa and Zulu.

Notes

External links
 Digital Shikshapatri Provides a wide variety of online resources which set the Shikshapatri in its historical, cultural and religious context - The oldest copy of the Shikshapatri in the world today is shown, in digital form.
 MS. Ind. Inst. Sansk. 72 Images available in Digital Bodleian

Hindu texts
Swaminarayan Sampradaya